Pone is a surname. Notable people with the surname include:

 Elise Pone (born 1985), American mixed martial artist 
 Gundaris Pone (1932–1994), Latvian-American composer